Jilled is under  Chowdarguda Gram panchayat in Kondurg mandal of Ranga Reddy district, Telangana, India and it is hamlet with Chowdarguda.

References

Villages in Ranga Reddy district